Barstool Sports is an American blog website and digital media company headquartered in New York City that produces content on sports and pop culture. Founded by David Portnoy in 2003 in Milton, Massachusetts. It is partially owned by Penn Entertainment.

History
Barstool began in 2003 as a print publication which was distributed in the Boston metropolitan area and offered gambling advertisements and fantasy sports projections, but later expanded to encompass other topics. It launched on the internet in 2007. In April 2014, AOL announced that they would be airing exclusive online content from Barstool Sports.

Purchase 
On January 7, 2016, Portnoy announced in an "emergency press conference" in Times Square that The Chernin Group had purchased a majority stake (51%) of Barstool Sports and the site would be moving its headquarters to New York City.

Background 
Chernin Group president of digital Mike Kerns appeared on the inaugural episode of Portnoy's podcast, The Dave Portnoy Show, to discuss the acquisition. During the appearance, Kerns and Portnoy detailed the beginning of their talks, when Kerns was put into contact with Portnoy via mutual friend and former University of Kentucky quarterback Jared Lorenzen. After an initial phone call, Kerns took a private plane from San Francisco to Boston in order to have dinner with Portnoy, discuss vision for Barstool and the future of the brand, and begin preliminary talks of an acquisition.

Restructuring 
Following the acquisition by The Chernin Group in January 2016, Portnoy continues to run the site and retains complete creative control as the company's Chief of Content. On July 19, 2016, Erika Nardini, former chief marketing officer of AOL, was announced as the CEO of Barstool Sports. In 2020, Chernin had seemed to relinquish the ownership of Barstool, which is now a joint venture between Portnoy and Penn Entertainment.

2017 
During the week of Super Bowl LI, Barstool broadcast a televised version of The Barstool Rundown live from Houston on Comedy Central. The show made headlines on February 2, 2017 after Indianapolis Colts punter Pat McAfee announced during a segment of that night's episode that he was retiring from the NFL to become a contributor to the site. On June 19, 2017, the site announced that Michael Rapaport would be joining Barstool Sports and hosting a podcast. Rappaport and Barstool quickly ended their relationship in a public feud involving Kevin Durant.

On October 18, Barstool Van Talk debuted on ESPN2. The show starred Pardon My Take personalities PFT Commenter and Dan "Big Cat" Katz. It was cancelled after one episode, with ESPN Inc. president John Skipper citing concerns about distinguishing the content of Barstool from that of ESPN. The show's removal came after past statements from Barstool president Dave Portnoy resurfaced, one of which involved calling current ESPN employee Sam Ponder a "slut".

2018 
Following a round of fundraising reported in January, Barstool is said to have received a valuation of $100 million. According to CEO Erika Nardini, The Chernin Group has invested $25 million in the website. On February 18, Michael Rapaport was fired after making a derogatory comment towards the site's fan-base.

On March 28, 2018, NBA player Frank Kaminsky launched a Barstool podcast, Pros and Joes, hosted by himself and three of his high-school friends.

2020

Penn National Gaming partnership 
On January 29, 2020, it was announced that Penn National Gaming (now Penn Entertainment) purchased a 36% stake in Barstool Sports for $163 million, giving the company a valuation of $450 million. In three years, Penn National, with a market value of roughly $3 billion, would increase its stake to around 50% for a payment of $62 million. At that time, Penn National and Barstool had options that would increase the casino company's stake to control or full ownership, based on fair market value at the time. Following the sale, The Chernin Group maintained a 36% stake in the company.

Barstool Sportsbook 
The company launched Barstool Sportsbook, a mobile application for sports betting, in Pennsylvania on September 18, 2020. During its first week of operation, it handled $11 million in wagers. In January 2021, the company announced that the Sportsbook would be expanding to the state of Michigan. Penn National announced that they would be matching all first time deposits by donating to the Barstool Fund, raising a total of $4,550,280 for Michigan small businesses. As of January 2023, the application is available in the following states Pennsylvania, Michigan, Illinois, Indiana, Colorado, Virginia, New Jersey, Tennessee, Arizona, Iowa, West Virginia, Louisiana, Ohio and Maryland.

2021–present 
On July 27, 2021, Barstool Sports was announced as the new title sponsor of the Arizona Bowl. The company will have exclusive international broadcast rights for the game for the duration of its contract. The 2021 edition of the Arizona Bowl was to be played at Arizona Stadium in Tucson on December 31. The game was canceled due to a COVID-19 outbreak. The 2022 Barstool Arizona Bowl was played on December 30, 2022 with the Ohio Bobcats defeating the Wyoming Cowboys 30-27, and featured various Barstool Sports media personalities on commentary and in on field roles.

On September 28, 2021, Barstool Sports partnered with Happi Foodi, a frozen meal brand, and launched a new line of ready-to-heat pizzas branded as One Bite Pizzas. One Bite Pizzas was initially launched in 3,500 Walmart stores, in addition to being made available via the One Bite App and online at walmart.com, freshdirect.com, and happifoodi.com.

Sports Bars

As of March 2023, Barstool Sports has opened sports bar locations revolving around the Barstool brand in Philadelphia, Chicago, and Scottsdale, Arizona.

Content 
David Portnoy has described the site's topics as "sports/smut." The site contains a mixture of podcasts, blogs, and video series featuring company staff in what has been described as "a sort of online reality show: Every office argument and personal-life development was written up and fed to a growing legion of 'Stoolies'."

Component sites 
 Boston
 New York City
 Chicago
 Philadelphia
 DC Metro
 BarstoolU

Radio 
The company operated Barstool Radio 85, a channel on Sirius XM, from January 2017 until January 2021, when a new contract agreement could not be reached. Barstool returned to radio in February 2021 with a daily sports betting-themed show called Barstool Sports: Picks Central, distributed by Westwood One.

Podcasts 
Barstool also produces numerous podcasts, including programming from David Portnoy, Spittin' Chiclets, Pardon My Take, The Kirk Minihane Show, as well as podcasts from Barstool bloggers and professional athletes and celebrities such as Deion Sanders, Alex Rodriguez, Josh Richards, Ryan Whitney, Paul Bissonnette, Colby Armstrong, Patrick Beverley, Jake Arrieta, Arian Foster, Paddy Pimblett, Molly McCann, Jim Florentine, Jamie Dukes, Taylor Lewan, Will Compton, and Mark Titus.

Notable former employees or podcast hosts include Jenna Marbles, Pat McAfee, Dallas Braden, Paul Lo Duca, Michael Rapaport, Terry Rozier, Frank Kaminsky, A. J. Hawk, Asa Akira, Willie Colon, and Julie Stewart-Binks.

Rough N' Rowdy 
The site owns and promotes Rough N' Rowdy, an amateur boxing league in West Virginia that the company showcases through pay-per-view events.

Over-the-top media 
Barstool offers streaming and Video on Demand content, which is available on Roku, Amazon Fire TV, Apple TV, and Android TV. The Yak is a daily live show with Barstool personalities Big Cat (Dan Katz), Rone (Adam Ferrone), Nick & KB (Nick Turani and Kyle Bauer), Kate, Lil Sasquatch, and Brandon Walker sitting around a studio and talking about random subjects. The show is televised live on YouTube and later made available as a podcast. In 2021, SLING TV announced an exclusive channel for Barstool Sports. The Brandon Walker College Football Show featuring Brandon Walker is a live call-in show that is part of the Sling TV Barstool channel.

Charitable work 
In the aftermath of the 2013 Boston Marathon bombings, the site raised $240,000 for the victims of the attack.

In April 2017, listeners of the Barstool Podcast, Pardon My Take, raised over $50,000 for the Justin J. Watt Foundation.

The site also frequently raises funds supporting veterans' causes and animal welfare. Barstool donated $150,000 to the family of a Weymouth, Massachusetts police officer who was killed on duty in July 2018.

The company partnered with NFL quarterback Baker Mayfield in 2018 to release a clothing line benefiting Special Olympics Ohio.

In October 2019, Barstool founder David Portnoy donated $20,000 to Penn State's annual IFC/Panhellenic Dance Marathon, which raises money for pediatric cancer research and treatment.

In November 2019, Portnoy announced that he would match a Veteran's Day fundraising campaign for mental health and PTSD that ended up garnering $91,000.

Barstool Fund 
In response to the COVID-19 pandemic and related government restrictions, Barstool launched The Barstool Fund, a fundraising non-profit which provides financial support to small business owners across the United States. Over 200,000 people contributed to the fund and over 41 million dollars has been raised. Many celebrities such as Tom Brady, Guy Fieri, Kid Rock, Aaron Rodgers and Elon Musk have given to the fund, on top of an initial 500,000 dollar donation from Portnoy.

Traffic 
In January 2016, Forbes reported that Barstool Sports was averaging over 8 million unique visitors a month.  it has a global Alexa rank of 5,582 and a US rank of 1,072.

Controversies

Baby photo comments
In August 2011, the site received criticism over nude photos of American football quarterback Tom Brady's two-year-old son, which was accompanied by comments describing the size of the child's genitalia, which a former prosecutor suggested was sexualization of a minor. Portnoy argued that the comments were meant to be humorous in tone and were not intended to be seen as sexual.

Rape comments
Critics allege that comments on the site by Portnoy and others normalize rape culture. Comments that have sparked debate include a post on a 2010 blog in which Portnoy said  though I never condone rape if you're a size 6 and you're wearing skinny jeans you kind of deserve to be raped right?" Other elements that have received criticism include comments such as "we don't condone rape of any kind at our Blackout Parties ... however if a chick passes out that's a gray area". Portnoy, in response, has stated that, "...It's not our intent, with jokes, to poke fun at rape victims," while pointing out the satirical nature of the site's content. A Northeastern University protest group called Knockout Barstool held a demonstration outside of a 2012 Blackout party at Boston's House of Blues. Portnoy has been openly dismissive of the protest group, referring to them as "serial protesters", "nutbags" and "crazy bitches".

Blackout parties
The Blackout Tour parties were criticized for promoting excessive drinking and allowing underage drinking, as well as for assaults that have happened at the proceedings. In February 2012, then-Boston mayor Thomas M. Menino expressed concern through a spokesperson over the parties' promotion of "excessive drinking to the point of blacking out" and that such promotion would not be a good message for the city. Massachusetts Alcoholic Beverage Control Commission agents and club security at a House of Blues event in Boston the following month confiscated 300 fake identifications and refused admission for around three-fourths of the event's 2000 ticket holders. Shortly thereafter Portnoy announced that the company would not be scheduling more of the events in Boston, stating that "it just doesn't seem like Boston is friendly to nightlife of our sort, at least".

Copyright issues

According to The Daily Beast, Barstool has a culture of stealing materials from independent content creators and reposting them without attribution. In March 2019, Barstool was accused by comedian Miel Bredouw of having re-posted one of her videos to the site's Twitter account without attribution. After Bredouw eventually refused to rescind her complaint in exchange for $2,000, Barstool filed a counter-claim asking Twitter to reinstate the video, alleging that the take-down was an error.  Following the dispute, data from Social Blade revealed that on March 6, 2019 Barstool deleted over 60,000 posts from its Twitter account and 1,000 posts from its Instagram account.

References

External links
 

American sport websites
Internet properties established in 2007
Sirius XM Radio channels
Sports betting
Podcasting companies